HOME is the twelfth studio album by Mr. Children, released on March 14, 2007. Its first press limited edition includes a documentary DVD on the making of the album and live performances by members of the group between recording sessions. The album debuted at the number 1 position, with 693,038 copies sold in the first week.

Its first single  was used as the theme song for a series of Toyota commercials. The second single, used as the theme song to the Japanese television drama, was the seventh best selling single, with over 550,000 copies sold in 2006. The last single, released on January 24, 2007, was used as the theme song to the live-action film adaptation of Osamu Tezuka's Dororo. The B-sides are also available on their B-SIDE compilation.

Mr. Children held 14 concerts in support of the album, known as the HOME Tour, from May 4, 2007 to June 23, 2007. They visited 7 cities in Japan. They performed songs from the album, as well as a selection of their old songs were in their tour. Another tour, known as HOME -in the field-, was held from August 4, 2007 - September 30, 2007. A previously unreleased song,  debuted in their second tour.

The cover art features some people swimming in the swimming pool, It generally received favorable reviews by the critics.

HOME is the best selling album in the 2007 Oricon Yearly Album Chart marking their first yearly number 1 position on the charts in their 16th year since their debut. A total of 1,181,241 copies were sold in 2007.

Track listing
 – 1:06
 "Wake me up!" – 5:52
  – 5:25
  – 5:12
 "Another Story" – 5:19
 "Piano Man" – 4:45
  – 4:48
  – 4:29
  – 4:56
  – 5:51
 "Sunrise" – 6:35
  – 7:12
  – 5:26
  – 5:24

References

2007 albums
Japanese-language albums
Mr. Children albums
Albums produced by Takeshi Kobayashi